The slender emo skink (Emoia physicae) is a species of lizard in the family Scincidae. It is found in Papua New Guinea.

References

Emoia
Reptiles described in 1839
Reptiles of Papua New Guinea
Endemic fauna of Papua New Guinea
Taxa named by André Marie Constant Duméril
Taxa named by Gabriel Bibron
Skinks of New Guinea